Walt Disney (1901–1966) won or received a total of twenty-six Academy Awards and holds the record for most Academy Awards in history. He won twenty-two competitive Academy Awards from a total of fifty-nine nominations, and also holds the records for most wins and most nominations for an individual in history.

Disney won his first competitive Academy Award and received his first Honorary Academy Award at the 5th Academy Awards (1932). He received the Honorary Academy Award for the creation of Mickey Mouse and won the Academy Award for Best Short Subject (Cartoon) for the film Flowers and Trees. In the seven Academy Award ceremonies that followed (6th–12th), Disney consecutively earned nominations and won in the same category.

Disney received three more Honorary Academy Awards, one in 1939 and two in 1942. At the 26th Academy Awards (1954), Disney won the Academy Award in all four categories in which he was nominated: Best Short Subject (Cartoon), Best Short Subject (Two-reel), Best Documentary (Feature), and Best Documentary (Short Subject). In 1965, Disney earned his sole Best Picture nomination, for the film Mary Poppins. He was posthumously awarded his final Academy Award in 1969 for Winnie the Pooh and the Blustery Day.

Competitive Academy Awards

Footnotes
≠ indicates the award was accepted by someone else (in this case, the winning film's director Wolfgang Reitherman)

Honorary Academy Awards

See also 

 List of Academy Award records
 List of people who have won multiple Academy Awards in a single year
 List of posthumous Academy Award winners and nominees

References

External links 
D23 entry

Academy Awards
Academy Awards
Disney
Disney, Walt, Academy Awards received by